Andrew Glover may refer to:

Andrew Glover (composer) (born 1962), English composer
Andrew Glover (American football) (born 1967), American football player
Andrew Glover (American basketball) (born 1995), American basketball coach